Don W. Scott  (born 20 December 1945) is a former Australian rules footballer who represented  in the Victorian Football League (VFL) from 1967-1981.

Over his 302 game VFL career, Scott built a reputation as an aggressive ruckman and a team enforcer. As captain, he led the Hawks to two premierships.

Scott played 302 games in the brown and gold over a 15-year career that spanned between 1967 and 1981, winning three premierships with the club as well as the 1973 best and fairest award. 

The club's captain from 1976 to 1980, Scott was recognised as one of the most fearless ruckmen of his era.

An intimidating competitor, he played with enormous courage, doing what was necessary to win with a remorseless, tough mode of attrition.

Early career
If Scott had not become a footballer, he very well might have become a champion horse rider. His father Doug was a schoolteacher and his grandfather was an avid horseman. At 16 years of age he won a jumping and riding prize at the Royal Melbourne Show on a horse he had trained himself. Throughout his football career and afterwards, Scott continued to be heavily involved in the equine industry, whether it was horse-rearing, merchandising equine products, or competing in showjumping.

Scott was educated at Blackburn High School.

Because of his aggressive style of play, Scott was a frequent visitor to the tribunal, whether he was the purported instigator or the victim; he was reported 15 times but only suspended for a total of 11 matches.

Life after football and Operation Payback
However, the playing group could not adapt to Scott's tough style of coaching and he quit after just six games in charge, all of them defeats.

After returning to Melbourne, Scott was recruited by television station Channel 7 to be an expert commentator for their VFL telecasts, including providing special comments during a number of Grand Finals.

In 1996, Scott was the founder of the "Operation Payback" campaign, which was ultimately successful in its efforts to prevent Hawthorn from merging with another AFL club, Melbourne.  Scott rallied many supporters and former Hawthorn players in opposition to the proposed Melbourne Hawks formation.

From 1996 - 2003, Scott was a director of the Hawthorn Football Club.

In 2001, Scott was inducted into the Australian Football Hall of Fame.

In 2003, Scott was inducted into the Hawthorn Football Club Hall of Fame.

In 2004 & 2005, Scott’s son Doug Scott was on the Hawthorn AFL list however played 0 senior matches. 

In March 2012, it was announced that Scott had been diagnosed with an aggressive form of prostate cancer, but because he went for annual check-ups the cancer was detected early, which increased the likelihood of survival.

In August 2019, he joined a podcast with former Herald Sun Chief Football Writer Mike Sheahan and former footballer and media personality Sam Newman entitled Sam, Mike and Don, You Can Not Be Serious. The podcast airs once weekly and covers all trending topics with some AFL and sport commentary. However, upon Sheahan quitting the podcast in June 2020 due to fallout from comments he made about former AFL footballer Nicky Winmar, its name was changed to You Cannot Be Serious.

In November 2019, the Hawthorn Football Club nominated Don Scott to become an official legend of the club; however, Scott refused to accept the award.

In July 2020, Scott alleged that the Hawthorn Football Club broke salary cap rules throughout their successful 80s dynasty utilising a secret Tasmanian bank account to retain players outside of the salary cap.

In December 2021, Don Scott finally accepted being elevated to an official legend of the Hawthorn Football Club.

In April 2022, as reported in the Herald Sun newspaper, Don Scott was appointed to the Hawthorn Football Club’s nominations committee to select the next club President to succeed Jeff Kennett.

Honours and achievements 
Hawthorn
 3× VFL premiership player: 1971, 1976, 1978
 2× Minor premiership: 1971, 1975

Individual
 2× VFL premiership captain: 1976, 1978
 J.J. Dennis Memorial Trophy: 1973
 Hawthorn captain: 1976–1980
 Australian Football Media Association Player of the Year: 1977
 Australian Football Hall of Fame
 Hawthorn Hall of Fame – Legend status
 Hawthorn life member
 Hawthorn Team of the Century

References

Bibliography

External links
 Profile at Australian Football
 AFL: Hall of Fame

Hawthorn Football Club players
Hawthorn Football Club Premiership players
Hawthorn Football Club administrators
Australian Football Hall of Fame inductees
Peter Crimmins Medal winners
Australian rules footballers from Victoria (Australia)
South Adelaide Football Club coaches
1947 births
Living people
People educated at Blackburn High School
Three-time VFL/AFL Premiership players